is a mountain located on Uotsuri-jima of Senkaku Islands in Ishigaki, Okinawa, Japan. It is the highest point of the island. It was named after Narahara Shigeru, the eighth governor of Okinawa Prefecture.

References 

Mountains of Okinawa Prefecture
Senkaku Islands